Lucien Lessard Jr. (born May 26, 1980), known as Junior Lessard, is a Canadian former professional ice hockey player who last played for the Thetford Mines Isothermic of the LNAH.

Playing career
As a youth, Lessard played in the 1993 and 1994 Quebec International Pee-Wee Hockey Tournaments with a minor ice hockey team from Beauce, Quebec.

Lessard attended the University of Minnesota Duluth, where he led the NCAA in goals (32) and points (63) as a senior during the 2003–04 season, numbers that would be good enough to win the Hobey Baker Award. He also led the WCHA in the same categories with 19 goals and 39 points in conference play.

On April 15, 2004, Lessard signed a free agent contract with the Dallas Stars and made his NHL debut during the 2005–06 season.

Lessard was traded to Tampa Bay on January 15, 2008 in exchange for Dan Jancevski.

Lessard signed a contract with the Atlanta Thrashers on July 9, 2008 and was assigned to affiliate the Chicago Wolves to start the 2008–09 season.

On January 13, 2009, Lessard was traded by the Thrashers to the New York Islanders for Brett Skinner and was immediately sent to the Islanders' AHL affiliate, the Bridgeport Sound Tigers.

On October 7, 2009, Lessard signed a one-year contract with SM-liiga team Ilves, but was released on November 4 due to injury after only four games.

On January 13, 2010, Lessard signed with Canadian semi-pro team the Thetford Mines Isothermic of the LNAH.

On February 1, 2010, after recovering from injury, Lessard signed with German team Augsburger Panther of the DEL for the remainder of the season.

Awards and honors

1998–99 -MJHL All-Rookie Team
1999–00 -MJHL First All-Star Team
1999–00 -MJHL Most Valuable Player
Named Canadian Junior A Hockey League Player of the Year with the Portage Terriers of the Manitoba Junior Hockey League
2003–04 -WCHA Player of the Year
2003–04 -NCAA Hobey Baker Award
National Player of the Year honors in 2004 by College Hockey Online and Inside College Hockey

Career statistics

References

External links

1980 births
Living people
Augsburger Panther players
Canadian ice hockey forwards
Chicago Wolves players
Dallas Stars players
Hobey Baker Award winners
Houston Aeros (1994–2013) players
Ice hockey people from Quebec
Idaho Steelheads (ECHL) players
Ilves players
Iowa Stars players
Portage Terriers players
Minnesota Duluth Bulldogs men's ice hockey players
Norfolk Admirals players
People from Beauce, Quebec
Tampa Bay Lightning players
Undrafted National Hockey League players
Canadian expatriate ice hockey players in Finland
Canadian expatriate ice hockey players in Germany
AHCA Division I men's ice hockey All-Americans